Benhall is a village and civil parish in the East Suffolk district of Suffolk, England. Located to the south of Saxmundham, in 2007 its population was estimated to be 560, reducing to 521 at the 2011 Census.

Geography 
Benhall is split into two; one side of the A12 road is Benhall Low Street, whereas the other is Benhall Green. Benhall Green has a small primary school and a playgroup. 

There is no public house in the village. However, Benhall & Sternfield Ex. Servicemens Club, which is located off School Lane in Benhall Green, provides the village with a warm and welcoming bar with pool, snooker, live sports on TV, and regular member events.  It also has a function hall available to hire for all occasions.  The Club is open Monday-Wednesday and Fridays in the week from 6pm and at weekends from 12 noon.  

The 15th century church of St Mary is a grade II* listed building. The actor Guy Rolfe is buried in the churchyard.

History 
The manor of Benhall was granted in 1086 to Robert de Malet, and has since had a long and complicated history, having been owned by many of the most powerful people of their time, including the De La Poles, the Howards and King Henry VIII.

Benhall Lodge 
The great house of the area is Benhall Lodge. A manor house had existed on the Benhall estate since at least 1225, when it was fortified by Ralph de Sunderland. Long known as Benhall Lodge, the house has been rebuilt by various Lords of the Manor: including in 1638 by Sir Edward Duke, Bt., in 1790 by William Beaumaris Rush, and in 1810 by Edward Hollond. The mansion house has suffered serious fires in 1885 and in 1967, and was restored and slightly remodelled after each. The walled kitchen garden of the country house is now a separate business concern, but the house itself and the surrounding gardens and parkland remains private residential property.

Sport 
Benhall St Mary Football Club recently won SIL Division 2 2013/14 season. The Badgers, as the club has been nicknamed due to their kit colour, will now progress into Division 1 for the 2014/15 season.  They play their home games on the pitch at Benhall & Sternfield Ex Servicemens Club (which they affectionately call 'The Den').

Notable residents
Edward Glemham, privateer 
Sir Edward Duke, 1st Baronet
Sir John Duke, 2nd Baronet
Hyde Parker, admiral
William Christian Sellé, musician
Guy Rolfe, actor

References

External links
 
Benhall and Sternfield Parish Council
Benhall Near the Coast

Villages in Suffolk
Civil parishes in Suffolk